The 2021 Moneta Czech Open was a professional tennis tournament played on clay courts. It was the 28th edition of the tournament which was part of the 2021 ATP Challenger Tour. It took place in Prostějov, Czech Republic between 14 and 20 June 2021.

Singles main-draw entrants

Seeds

 1 Rankings are as of 31 May 2021.

Other entrants
The following players received wildcards into the singles main draw:
  Andrew Paulson
  Daniel Siniakov
  Dalibor Svrčina

The following player received entry into the singles main draw using a protected ranking:
  Andrey Kuznetsov

The following player received entry into the singles main draw as an alternate:
  Jonáš Forejtek

The following players received entry from the qualifying draw:
  Alexander Erler
  Skander Mansouri
  David Poljak
  Alex Rybakov

The following players received entry as lucky losers:
  Johannes Härteis
  Jelle Sels

Champions

Singles

  Federico Coria def.  Alex Molčan 7–6(7–1), 6–3.

Doubles

  Aleksandr Nedovyesov /  Gonçalo Oliveira def.  Roman Jebavý /  Zdeněk Kolář 1–6, 7–6(7–5), [10–6].

References

2021 ATP Challenger Tour
2021
2021 in Czech tennis
June 2021 sports events in the Czech Republic